Mannings Folly was a three-storey building located on the corner of Pakenham Street and Short Street, in Fremantle, Western Australia. It was erected in 1858 by Charles Alexander Manning as a hostel for Indian army officers and civil servants. The building was subsequently used as the Manning's private residence.

Manning, earlier a trader, was a chairman of the Fremantle Town Trust (1859-1867), and he lived in the building until he died in 1869. Manning was a passionate amateur astronomer 

It was a prominent three-storey building on the Fremantle townscape, in the era that it existed.

A customs and shipping agent, John MacKnight, used the building between 1914 and 1924. It was demolished in May 1928, following a decision by the City of Fremantle to approve the demolition in March that year. It was replaced by a substantial warehouse.

The top of the folly was used by early photographers to capture images of parts of Fremantle and Fremantle Harbour.

It is currently the site of Quest Apartments.

Notes

Former buildings and structures in Perth, Western Australia
1858 establishments in Australia
1928 disestablishments in Australia
Buildings and structures demolished in 1928